The 1954 Arizona Wildcats football team represented the University of Arizona in the Border Conference during the 1954 college football season.  In their third season under head coach Warren B. Woodson, the Wildcats compiled a 7–3 record (3–2 against Border opponents) and outscored their opponents, 385 to 215. The team captains were Buddy Lewis and Glen Bowers.  The team played its home games in Arizona Stadium in Tucson, Arizona.

The team's average of 38.5 points per game was the second highest in major college football during the 1954 season. Tailback Art Luppino was the NCAA rushing leader with 1,359 rushing yards. Luppino also broke the NCAA modern-era single-season scoring record with 166 points scored in 1954.

Schedule

References

Arizona
Arizona Wildcats football seasons
Arizona Wildcats football